The Korets Castle is a castle built in Korets ca. 1400 by either Prince Theodor Ostrogski or Prince Dymitr Korybut. Its main tower is featured in the town's emblem.

The moated castle on the bank of the Korchyk River was the seat of the princely House of Korets between the 15th and 17th centuries. After the main princely line died out in 1651, Korets passed through inheritance to a junior line of the Czartoryski family. In 1780, Józef Klemens Czartoryski rebuilt the castle to serve as his main residence. 

As Józef Klemens had no male issue, the castle was neglected after his death. It burnt down in the wake of the November Uprising in 1832. Over the years the ruins have steadily deteriorated and by the late 20th century have all but disappeared.

References 
 Памятники градостроительства и архитектуры Украинской ССР. Киев: Будивельник, 1983–1986. Том 3, с. 312.

External links 
 

Castles in Ukraine
Buildings and structures in Rivne Oblast
Czartoryski family